Micaria rossica is a spider in the family Gnaphosidae ("ground spiders"), in the infraorder Araneomorphae ("true spiders").
The distribution range of Micaria rossica includes North America, Europe, Turkey, Caucasus, Russia to Central Asia, and China.

References

Gnaphosidae
Spiders described in 1875